Out of the Past is a 1947 American film noir.

Out of the Past may also refer to:

Film
 Out of the Past (1927 film), an American silent drama film
 Out of the Past (1933 film), a British crime film

Television episodes
 "Out of the Past" (Agents of S.H.I.E.L.D.), 2020
 "Out of the Past" (Batman Beyond), 2000
 "Out of the Past" (The Legend of Korra), 2012
 "Out of the Past" (Moonlight), 2007
 "Out of the Past" (Roseanne), 1996
 "Out of the Past" (X-Men), 1994